The Federated States of Micronesia competed at the 2017 World Aquatics Championships in Budapest, Hungary from 14 July to 30 July.

Swimming

The Federated States of Micronesia have received a Universality invitation from FINA to send three swimmers (two men and one woman) to the World Championships.

References

World Aquatics Championships
2017
Nations at the 2017 World Aquatics Championships